Rurua is a Georgian surname. Notable people with the surname include:

Nika Rurua (born 1968), Georgian politician
Roman Rurua (born 1942), Georgian wrestler 
Zurab Rurua (born 1987), Georgian water polo player

Georgian-language surnames